Mick Gannon (born 2 February 1947 in Dublin) was an Irish football player in the 1970s who played for Shelbourne and for Shamrock Rovers.

Gannon was a diminutive but tenacious right-back who enjoyed a long and successful career in the League of Ireland. A skilful attacker, Gannon was on occasion used in midfield, though it was in the number two shirt that he made his international debut, in Liam Tuohy's first game as manager of the Irish national team against Austria in Linz in October 1971.

He signed for the Milltown club in November 1977 from Shels, where he had lost 2 FAI Cup Finals, and in his first season he won the FAI Cup. He went to make 4 appearances in European competition for the Hoops and was in the side that played in the first ever European tie at Milltown.

He returned to Shels in January 1981, where he ended his league career.

His uncle Eddie Gannon also played for his country and his son Karl Gannon played for Rovers in the 1990s.

Honours

 FAI Cup: 1
 Shamrock Rovers 1978

Sources 
 The Hoops by Paul Doolan and Robert Goggins

1947 births
Living people
Republic of Ireland association footballers
Shamrock Rovers F.C. players
Association footballers from County Dublin
League of Ireland players
League of Ireland XI players
Republic of Ireland international footballers
Association football fullbacks